Mehmed Esad Saffet Pasha, also known as Saffet Pasha (1814–1883), was an Ottoman statesman, diplomat and reformer, who served as the Grand Vizier of the Ottoman Empire during the reign of Abdul Hamid II. He was a representative of the Ottoman Empire, alongside Sadullah Pasha at the Congress of Berlin.

Biography

He was born in Constantinople as the son of Mehmed Hulusi Ağa who was from Sürmene. He was Turkish origin.

He was a reformer of education during the Tanzimat period of the Ottoman Empire, as he was one of the co-founders of the prestigious Galatasaray High School. Saffet Pasha also represented the Ottoman Government at the 1876 Constantinople Conference.

See also
List of Ottoman Grand Viziers

References

19th-century Grand Viziers of the Ottoman Empire
Tanzimat
1814 births
1883 deaths
Ministers of Foreign Affairs of the Ottoman Empire